"Give This Christmas Away" is a Christmas song by American contemporary Christian musician and singer-songwriter Matthew West from his 2011 Christmas album The Heart of Christmas. The song was released as a single on October 6, 2009. It features guest vocals from American singer and songwriter Amy Grant. The song became West's fourth Hot Christian Songs No. 1 and Grant's first, staying there for one week. It lasted 6 weeks on the overall chart. It also had the biggest drop from No. 1 on the Hot Christian Songs of all time, falling to No. 46 the following week. The song is played in a C major key, and 174 beats per minute.

Background 
"Give This Christmas Away" was released on October 6, 2009, as a single from his first Christmas album The Heart of Christmas. The song inspired West to make his own campaign using the song as a message. He wrote and recorded it for VeggieTales with its new DVD release, "Saint Nicholas–A Story of Joyful Giving." The campaign brings attention to the types of ways we can reach out to those in need around us. West explains,"What it means to me to ‘give this Christmas away’ is to pause long enough to look at the world from a perspective of ‘How can I help? How can I give? How can God use me to help meet the needs of somebody else this Christmas instead of just checking off the list of everything I want?'"

A book, "Give This Christmas Away (101 simple & thoughtful ways to...)", was inspired by the song's release, published by Tyndale Publishers.

Music video 
The music video for the single "Give This Christmas Away" was released on October 6, 2009. The visual features West and Grant performing the song with scenes of children receiving gifts appear throughout.

Track listing
CD release
 "Give This Christmas Away (feat. Amy Grant)" – 4:43
 "Give This Christmas Away (Medium Key Performance Track with Background Vocals)" – 4:43
 "Give This Christmas Away (High Key Performance Track / No Background Vocals)" – 4:43
 "Give This Christmas Away (Medium Key Performance Track / No Background Vocals)" – 4:43
 "Give This Christmas Away (Low Key Performance Track / No Background Vocals)" – 4:38

Charts

References

2009 songs
2009 singles
American Christmas songs
Songs written by Sam Mizell
Songs written by Matthew West
Sparrow Records singles